John T. Hoggard High School is a public high school in the New Hanover County School System in Wilmington, North Carolina.

Naming 
John T. Hoggard is the eponym for Hoggard High School. Hoggard had an active career in education, beginning with his election as Chairman of the New Hanover County (NC) Board of Education in 1935, and ending with his death in 1965. His private papers are kept in the Manuscript Collection at the University of North Carolina—Wilmington.

Athletics

Hoggard High School fields 25 varsity and junior varsity teams across 13 sports.  All teams compete in the Mideastern 3A/4A Conference as part of the North Carolina High School Athletic Association.

The school mascot is the Viking, and the primary colors are blue and white.

Football
The Hoggard football team won their eighth straight conference championship in 2009. In 2007, the team won the NC state 4-A championship with an undefeated record.  Hoggard played the championship game against Mount Tabor and defeated them by a score of 28–0.

Academics
John T. Hoggard High School offers fourteen Advanced Placement courses and a substantial number of honors classes. In its class of 2007, 67% of graduating students went on to four-year colleges, and another 29% went on to two-year colleges. 90% of the class took the SAT, and the average math score was 545, while the average critical reading score was 524.

The school also has arts, music, and Career and Technical Education (CTE) programs that allow students to prepare for post-secondary study or careers in areas of business, health care, architecture, engineering, culinary arts, horticulture.

In 2014, Hoggard ranked 11th in the U.S. News & World Report magazine list of top high schools in North Carolina.

Arts

Voyagers
The Voyagers are Hoggard's advanced choral ensemble. The Voyagers were established within the first year of Hoggard's existence and participate in numerous events. The original Voyagers class were responsible for the composition of Hoggard's alma mater, to the tune of Eternal Father, Strong to Save.

Notable people

Alumni
Connor Barth, former NFL kicker
Bob Boyd, professional golfer who played on the PGA Tour
Derek Brunson, UFC fighter
Deb Butler, member of the North Carolina House of Representatives
Jonathan Cooper, former NFL offensive guard
Kristen Dalton, Miss USA 2009
Julia Dalton, Miss North Carolina USA 2015
Christopher Jones, actor and dancer
Brad Keeney, former NFL defensive tackle
Kimberly Munley, civilian police officer who helped in stopping the November 2009 shooting at Fort Hood
 Ralph Ronald "Ron" Musselman, MLB pitcher for the Seattle Mariners (1982) and Toronto Blue Jays (1984–1985)
Bill Saffo, Mayor of Wilmington, longest-serving Mayor in city history
 Todd Vasos, CEO of Dollar General

Faculty
John Rinka, teaches English; was a college basketball stand–out at Kenyon College from 1966 to 1970 and scored over 3,000 career points

References

External links
School website
School district website

Educational institutions established in 1967
Public high schools in North Carolina
Schools in Wilmington, North Carolina
1967 establishments in North Carolina